The SIGNIS Awards are presented annually by SIGNIS, the Roman Catholic lay movement for communication media professionals, to recognize excellence of professionals in the film industry, including directors, actors, and writers. There are SIGNIS chapters in numerous countries and this article deals with the Sri Lankan chapter.

Background
SIGNIS (Sri Lanka) developed in November 2001 from the merger of national chapters of OCIC and Unda. OCIC was the international Catholic communications organisation for cinema and Unda was the international Catholic organisation for radio and television. Both organisations were founded in 1928 in Sri Lanka. SIGNIS Sri Lanka is one of 16 Asian units of the worldwide association of SIGNIS, which general secretariat is established in Brussels, Belgium.

Leading directors in Sri Lanka cinema have described being inspired by the Film Review Caucus, a mini-theater organized by OCIC in Colombo. It arranged screenings and encouraged students to write reviews and analyze films. Director Prasanna Vithanage commented in 2007: 
"We do not have a film school in Sri Lanka even now," he pointed out, recalling how the current crop of directors got their start. "We learned everything through watching films. Many of the young directors in the industry today were groomed at the Film Review Caucus, which was started at the mini-theater by then-director Father Ernest Poruthota. Then I followed the film course, which was a practical course," he recounted.In March 2013, the director founded the Prasanna Vithanage Film School in Colombo.

SIGNIS Awards (Sri Lanka)
The SIGNIS Sri Lanka Awards for films and television serials are similar to the Academy Awards in the United States. They recognize achievements in various categories such as directing, editing, musical scoring, camerawork and lighting. The awards ceremony, also like its Hollywood counterpart, has become a gala event that attracts film and television stars, directors, cameramen, scriptwriters, critics and journalists. The award presentations are interspersed with dance and music performances by leading artists, and clips from award-winning movies and TV programs. Aside from the industry awards, SIGNIS Sri Lanka also recognizes individual contributions to local cinema and television through its "Homage" and "Special Salutation" lifetime awards.

2012 Awards
In September 2012, the 36th SIGNIS Salutation Ceremony was held in Colombo. Salinda Perera's Dheewari ("Fisherman's Daughter") -- see dheevari.com-- obtained the major prize in the cinema section. It swept all major award categories including Best Director for Salinda Perera, and Best Screenplay by Darrell Costa and Salinda Perera, from a novel by Raja Proctor. (It dramatizes the story of Valli, a valiant fisherman's daughter, who breaks social taboos in her fight to unify and modernize a fishing village long oppressed by the mudalali bosses.)  Saman Kumara Liyanage's Sandagiri Pawwa received most of the key tele-drama prizes. CIC Agri Businesses' advertisement, created to communicate its corporate values, won the award for TV commercial for "creative arts, television and cinema", for 2012. The Jury panel included Rev. Fr. Benedict Joseph (Chairman of Signis), Senior Journalist Kala Keerthi Edwin Ariyadasa, and Senior Media Spokesperson Aruna Lokuliyana.

41st SIGNIS Awards

42nd SIGNIS Awards

Signis Awards of Merit
"Jayawilal Wilegoda Award for Best Amateur Critic"  
1986  - Nihal Peries
1987  - Nisitha Warnasooriya
1988  - Erik Ilayapparachchi
1989  - Premachandra Roopasinhe
1991  - Ajantha Hapuarachchi
1992  - suguth mahadooleweaaa

1993  - Thusitha Jayasundara.
1996  - Ajith Galappaththi
1997  - Charitha Dissanayake
1998  - Nuwan Nayanajith Kumar
2000  - Suranga Senanayake
2002  - Boopathy Nalin Wickramage
2003  - Indika Nishantha Udugampala
2004  - Lionel Rajapakshe

Best Picture

1970s
1973 - Ahas Gauwa 
1977 - Bambaru Awith

1980s
1981 - Soldadu Unnahe

2000s
2006 - Ira Mediyama 
2008 - Sankara  and  Aganthukaya 
2011 - Bambara Walalla  
2012 - Dheewari (Dheevari aka Fisherman's Daughter)

Best Director

1970s
1973 - Dharmasena Pathiraja – Ahas Gauwa
1977 - Dharmasena Pathiraja – Bambaru Awith

1980s
1981 - Dharmasena Pathiraja – Soldadu Unnahe

2000s
2006 - Prasanna Vithanage – Ira Mediyama
2005 - Boodee Keerthisena  – Mille Soya (Buongiorno Italia)

Best Cinematographer

1990s
1996 - Andrew Jayamanne Julietge Bhoomikawa
1979 - Andrew Jayamanne Handaya
1972 - Andrew Jayamanne  Haralaksaya

References

Sri Lankan film awards